Ghayavi, or Boianaki, is an Austronesian language of the eastern Papua New Guinean mainland.

External links 
 Materials on Ghayavi are included in the open access Arthur Capell collections (AC2) held by Paradisec.

References

Nuclear Papuan Tip languages
Languages of Milne Bay Province